Big Spring may refer to:

Communities
Big Spring, Montgomery County, Missouri, a census-designated place 
Big Spring, Carter County, Tennessee, an unincorporated community
Big Spring, Meigs County, Tennessee, an unincorporated community
Big Spring, Wilson County, Tennessee, a ghost town
Big Spring, Texas, a city in and the county seat of Howard County
Big Spring Independent School District, in Big Spring, Texas
Big Spring, Wisconsin, an unincorporated community
Big Spring School District, in Newville, Pennsylvania
Big Spring Township, Seneca County, Ohio
Big Spring Township, Shelby County, Illinois

Other
Big Spring (Michigan), a spring also called Kitch-iti-kipi, in Palms Book State Park, Schoolcraft County, Michigan
Big Spring (Missouri), a natural spring (hydrosphere) in the Missouri Ozarks
Big Spring (Pennsylvania), a historical site in Clearfield County, Pennsylvania
Big Spring Bombers, a defunct minor league baseball team formerly located in Big Spring, Texas
Big Spring Cafe, a greasy spoon restaurant located in Huntsville, Alabama
Big Spring Creek (Montana), four streams in Montana
Big Spring Creek (Pennsylvania), a tributary of Conodoguinet Creek in Cumberland County, Pennsylvania
Big Spring Jam, an annual music festival in Huntsville, Alabama
Big Spring Vietnam Memorial, a war memorial in Big Spring, Texas, honoring American servicemen

See also
Big Spring Park (disambiguation)
Big Spring State Park (disambiguation)
Big Springs (disambiguation)